Qingpu District,  is a suburban district of Shanghai Municipality. Lake Dianshan is located in Qingpu.

The population of Qingpu was counted at 1,081,000 people in the 2010 Census.

Qingpu District is the westernmost district of Shanghai Municipality; it is adjacent to Jiangsu and Zhejiang Provinces. Around the lake are a number of tourist scenic areas, all complete in tourist facilities. Among the tourist areas is the waterside town Zhujiajiao, a major tourist destination in the Shanghai region.

There are currently 21 domestic travel services, three international travel business departments, 14 star-rated hotels, and 3 AAAA-grade tourist spots in Qingpu District.

Transport 
 Line 17 (Shanghai Metro)
 China National Highway 318

Tourism 

Qingpu's tourist attractions include the Zhujiajiao Ancient Town, Oriental Land, Jinze Ancient Town, Lake Dianshan, and the Qushui Garden.

Economy
The China offices of Oishi are located here.

Culture
Baihe, the oldest town in Qingpu District, is famous for its performances of Shanghai opera.

Government
Qingpu Prison is in the district.

Education
The French School of Shanghai Qingpu Campus and the German School of Shanghai both share the EuroCampus in Qingpu District.

The International Philippine School of Shanghai (IPSS) is also in Qingpu District.

Notable residents
Chen Yun, an important cadre in the Deng Xiaoping era, was born here.
Gao Kang, District Governor

Subdistricts and towns
Qingpu District has three subdistricts and eight towns.

Climate

References

External links 

 

 
Districts of Shanghai